Omri Amrany (born 23 May 1954) is an Israeli-American best known as a sculptor and painter, though he also works in architecture and wall tapestry art. Philosophically a humanist, the human figure is his main subject matter.  He is co-founder of the Fine Art Studio of Rotblatt-Amrany in Fort Sheridan, Illinois, a studio that brings to the United States the aims and traditions of the Ateliers of Europe, as well as The Julia Foundation, a not-for-profit arts organization.

Works
More than 1,000 drawings, paintings, sculptures, wall tapestries, architectural designs, ceramics, murals, and installations, including Battle of the Amaleks (painting), Revealing,  Quest for Freedom, and Against the Wind (sculptures); The Spirit: Michael Jordan (heroic sculpture); The Fusion (multi-sculpture installation for Gary, Indiana); Veterans Memorial Park (9-acre site in Munster, Indiana); and recently Dirk Nowitzki statue in Dallas sponsored by Mark Cuban

Early life and work
Born in the Scottish Monastery Hospital in Tiberias, Israel, and raised in Kibbutz Ashdot Yaakov in the Jordan Valley, Omri Amrany is the son of a Yemenite father and Russian mother, both Jewish immigrants during the post-World War I era. From his father he learned wood sculpting and ceramics. His mother was a clothes designer who influenced his sense of design. Amrany grew up sketching and painting as part of everyday life.
During the Yom Kippur War, Amrany served as a paratrooper in the Israel Defense Forces (IDF) and saw a number of his fellow soldiers killed.Reentering civilian life, he dealt with post-combat stress by focusing on his artwork. 
In the late 1970s, influenced by his grandmother and aunt, he began to weave wall tapestries. He also began to paint on canvas in a storytelling style he labeled "tribal surrealism" – most notably in Battle of the Amaleks. This work, reminiscent of Picasso's Guernica in its ambition and intent, was Amrany's protest against the war in Lebanon. He humanized a landscape of Vadi Tzealim by integrating figures into the hills, stones, and Acacia trees, and told a story graphically through tanks and dead soldiers below the looming face of Moses.

After attending college classes in Tel Aviv, Amrany was assigned by his kibbutz in 1984 to work with the Israeli Scouts organization in Haifa, overseeing the education of 5,000 youths in the vicinity of Mount Carmel.

Pietrasanta
In 1985 Amrany was sent by his kibbutz to study marble carving in Italy. He traveled to Pietrasanta, where Michelangelo had lived and worked. He wanted to join Renzo Santoli's Studio, through whose window he could see the white marble mountaintop of Michelangelo's famous Altissimo quarry.  Santoli accepted him.  
While at Pietrasanta, Amrany met his future wife, artist Julie Rotblatt. She accompanied him when he returned to Israel in the spring of 1986. Upon arriving, he gave his first major solo exhibition in the ruins of historic Caesarea, the seaport built by Herod the Great. The two artists married in 1987, living first in Israel before relocating to the United States in 1989 and settling in the Chicago area. Amrany supplemented his income as an art instructor by taking jobs as a handyman.

New styles and experiments
Amrany's art has followed several strands throughout his career – distinct approaches or styles that he may set aside for years only to return to. In the early years after leaving the IDF, he explored minimalism (in sketches and drawings), idealism (as in his proposed work, The Peace Sculpture), and an approach based on a psychological tool known as the Johari window (most notably in a bronze titled Fear, Shadow and Subconscious).
His "sculpting montage" approach – which blends images to symbolize new dimensions – was first used in Quest for Freedom. Two bronze hands bound at the wrist suggest an eagle and convey the indomitable spirit of the unseen person to whom they belong. He later used the same approach in Whirlpool and One Minute before the 21st Century.

Amrany's long-standing fascination with quantum physics and Fractal math has also impacted his art in a variety of ways, from the design of silk wall tapestries to the fractal ground plan of the 9-acre Veterans Memorial Park in Munster, Indiana. The park opened in 2004, an array of works by Omri and Julie Rotblatt-Amrany that included seventeen bronze sculptures, three bas reliefs, fourteen laser-engraved granite panels, and eight installations.

Fine Art Studio of Rotblatt-Amrany
In 1992 Omri and Julie opened the Fine Art Studio of Rotblatt-Amrany, an educational center and workplace intended to duplicate the ateliers they had encountered in Europe. In its first two decades of operation, the facility has completed over 200 art commissions, hosted a half dozen exhibitions, and trained and supported over 300 artists – some of whom went on to national recognition.

In 1994 the Rotblatt-Amranys were commissioned by the Chicago Bulls to create a statue in honor of basketball legend Michael Jordan. The 16-foot sculpture, permanently installed outside the United Center in Chicago, sparked major media interest and drew acclaim for the way a ton of bronze could appear to fly. The sculpture has become one of Chicago's most-visited tourist sites. 
In 2008 Amrany co-founded The Julia Foundation, a not-for-profit organization with the mission of establishing a sculpture garden in historic Fort Sheridan, Illinois.

See also
Teamwork (sculpture)
Henry Bacon (painter)
Brian Andreas
Irving Guyer

References

1954 births
Living people
20th-century American painters
American male painters
21st-century American painters
Israeli artists
20th-century American sculptors
American male sculptors
People from Fort Sheridan, Illinois
Israeli emigrants to the United States
20th-century American male artists